Long Schoolhouse, also known as Washington Township District No. 13 and Nancy Long School, is a historic one-room school building located in Washington Township, Morgan County, Indiana.  It was built in 1883, and is a simple one-story, rectangular, brick building with a gable roof. It features segmental arched window openings.  It operated as a rural school until 1938.  It is maintained by the Jordan Home Economics Club, Inc. As of 2023, the roof has collapsed but the structure still stands.

It was listed on the National Register of Historic Places in 1999.

References

One-room schoolhouses in Indiana
School buildings on the National Register of Historic Places in Indiana
School buildings completed in 1883
Buildings and structures in Morgan County, Indiana
National Register of Historic Places in Morgan County, Indiana